Four Corners, Oklahoma may refer to unincorporated settlements in several counties in the U.S. state of Oklahoma:

Four Corners, Lincoln County, Oklahoma
Four Corners, Texas County, Oklahoma